The 1998 Volvo PGA Championship was the 44th edition of the Volvo PGA Championship, an annual professional golf tournament on the European Tour. It was held 22–25 May at the West Course of Wentworth Club in Virginia Water, Surrey, England, a suburb southwest of London.

Colin Montgomerie won his first Volvo PGA Championship with a one stroke victory over Ernie Els, Gary Orr and Patrik Sjöland.

Past champions in the field 
Ten former champions entered the tournament.

Made the cut

Missed the cut

Nationalities in the field

Round summaries

First round 
Thursday, 22 May 1998

Second round 
Friday, 23 May 1998

Third round 
Saturday, 24 May 1998

Final round 
Sunday, 25 May 1998

References 

BMW PGA Championship
Golf tournaments in England
Volvo PGA Championship
Volvo PGA Championship
Volvo PGA Championship